The Alpha Aviation Alpha 2000 is a two-seat, all-metal training and general aviation aircraft, designed by Chris Heintz and built in Hamilton, New Zealand.  It continues the successful French Apex Aircraft's Robin R2000 series acquired upon Apex's purchase of the Avions Robin company.

History 1971–1994

The original Avions Robin HR200 was designed by Christophe Heintz, to supplement the earlier Avions Robin designs of Jean Délémontez who also designed the popular post war wooden Jodel. The HR 200 prototype first flew on 19 July 1971, and entered production in 1973. The R2000 Alpha name was applied to a new aircraft which shared the fuselage of the HR 200, but had all new wing and tail surfaces, to allow aerobatics. The prototype R2000 Alpha flew on 15 January 1976 and production followed in 1977 to 1983. The aircraft features side-by-side seating, an innovative control stick mechanism which reduces the risk of blockage and an unusually large payload for an aerobatic aircraft, making it useful for overland trips as well.

Licensed production was also undertaken in Canada.

History 1994–2004
The R2160 model was returned to production with minor modifications in 1994 by Apex Aircraft. It was stressed to +6/−3 g and has a MTOW of 900 kg. There was also a fuel injected model (R2160i) and a non-aerobatic 120 hp trainer.

New Zealand production 2004–2008
In 2004 Alpha Aviation of New Zealand bought engineering jigs and equipment and worldwide production rights to both the Robin HR200 and Robin R2000 series. Alpha Aviation has recommenced production of the Robin R2120 as the Alpha 2000 120T and of the Robin R2160 as the Alpha 2000 160A and 160Ai. Apex continues to market the aircraft in Europe.

Production of the New Zealand development began in 2006 against orders for nine aircraft and eighteen options (including orders from the UK, South Africa and Australia), with capacity to build four aircraft a month. An Alpha 160A, ZK-FXY, was first off the production line, being test flown on 12 April 2006. It was subsequently used as a company demonstrator. It made its first public appearance at the 2006 Warbirds over Wanaka airshow. In January 2008 production was halted due to the liquidation of Alpha Aviation by parent company Inventis. Alpha Aviation Holdings Limited in New Zealand continues to hold the type certificate. The STC for spare parts supply was re-acquired by CEAPR in France in 2017.

Variants

Robin/Apex
R 2100A
Powered by 81 kW (108 hp) Lycoming O-235 engine. 34 built
R 2112 Alpha
Replacement for R 2100 with 83.5 kW (112 hp) Lycoming O-235 engine.
R 2160 Alpha Sport
119 kW (160 hp) Lycoming O-320 engine. Originally named Acrobin. R 2160 D: technically identical version with slightly reduced max. allowed RPM to meet German noise limitations.

Alpha Aviation
As of 2006 three variants are offered.  The approximate horsepower of each is indicated by the type number.
Alpha 120Tthe smallest and cheapest, envisaged as a trainer.
Alpha 160Aa more powerful fully aerobatic trainer.
Alpha 160Aia fuel injected engine and equipped for cross country touring as well as aerobatics.

Specifications (R2160 Alpha Sport)

See also

References

 Donald, David (ed.).The Encyclopedia of World Aircraft. Leicester: Blitz, 1997. .
 Taylor, John W. R. (ed.). Jane's All The World's Aircraft 1982–83. London: Jane's Yearbooks, 1982. .

External links

 Alpha Aviation website

Alpha 2000
1970s French sport aircraft
Low-wing aircraft
1970s New Zealand aircraft
HR200
Single-engined tractor aircraft
Aircraft first flown in 1976